Bolbolabad (also Romanized as Bolbolābād; also known as Bolbolak) is a village in Jakdan Rural District, in the Central District of Bashagard County, Hormozgan Province, Iran. At the 2006 census, its population was 574, in 120 families.

References 

Populated places in Bashagard County